Dhar Polytechnic Mahavidhyalaya, (शासकीय पॉलिटेक्निक कॉलेज) is a polytechnic college in Dhar. It was established in the city of Dhar, near Indore, in 1998 and is affiliated with Rajiv Gandhi Proudyogiki Vishwavidyalaya.

Dhar Polytechnic Mahavidhyalaya is one of the oldest technical colleges the region. This institute is running special Hi-Tech four year Advanced Diploma post Diploma in Industrial Electronics Engineering, Manufacturing Engineering, Mechatronics Engineering and three-year Diploma in Information technology, Computer Science. and with intake capacity of 60 in each discipline Based on Sandwich Pattern Designed to Meet the Requirements of Growing and upcoming industries in Advance disciplines.

Geography / Campus 
Dhar Polytechnic Mahavidhyalaya is located at  Indore Naka, Dhar, Madhya Pradesh 454001, India

The institute is spread over 7.985 hectares of land. It is situated about 1 km from Indore Naka in Dhar. The buildings and campus were constructed under world bank project in 1998. There are following infrastructure facilities available in the campus:
Rich Laboratories 
Council hall 
Conference room 
LRUC( Learning and Utilization Cell) 
Play grounds 
Modern computer centre 
Workshop 
Boys Hostel 
Staff quarters 
Computerised library 
A garden 
Two shades for Parking of vehicles

Campus

Department & Laboratory

Industrial Electronics Engineering 
The Department of Industrial Electronics Engineering was established in 1995. The department offers a 4-year advanced diploma course in Industrial Electronics Engineering. Industrial electronics engineering focuses on various aspects of the electronics engineering and its modern approach towards industrial automation.

"Department is having following labs”
Basic Electronics Lab
Electronics Workshop
Instrumentation Lab
Control Lab
Microprocessor Lab
Digital Electronics Lab 
Linear Integrated circuit Lab

Mechatronics Engineering]
The Department of Mechatronics Engineering was established in 1995. The department offers a 4-year advanced diploma course in Mechatronics Engineering based on sandwich pattern. Mechatronics engineering focuses on designing the mechanical system having complex electronic control.

"Department is having following labs”
Applied Mechanics Lab Electronics Workshop
CAD Lab
Material Testing Lab
Robotics Lab
CNC Lab
FMS Lab 
Machine Tool Lab

Manufacturing Engineering
The Department of Manufacturing Engineering was established in November 1994. The department offers a 4-year advanced diploma course in Manufacturing Engineering. Manufacturing engineering focuses on engineering design, manufacturing processes and materials, and the management and control of man-made systems.

"Department is having following labs”
Engineering Metrology
Maintenance Lab
Material Testing Lab
Control Lab
Industrial Control lab
Fluid Mechanics and Hydraulic Machines lab

Computer Science and Engineering
The Department of Computer Science was established in 2000. The department offers 3 year diploma in Computer Science and Engineering. Computer Lab No.1 and 2 contains 25 computer each all interconnected with LAN. Courses like Linux, RDBMS, Software Engineering, Computer Networks etc. are taught in this programme.

Information Technology
The Department of Information Technology was established in 2000. The department offers 3 year diploma in information Technology. Computer Lab No.1 and 2 contains 25 computer each all interconnected with LAN. Courses like Linux, RDBMS, Software Engineering, Computer Networks etc. are taught in this programme.

Library 
The Library consists of three storied building having more than 25,000 volumes & National, International journals and periodicals. The Library provides Xerox facility & is under process of computerisation. Dhar Polytechnic Mahavidhyalaya Library is a member .
Special features of new Library complex:
Air conditioned Reading Hall which is open for 12 hours a day throughout the year including Sundays & Holidays.
Fully computerized, having its own Database with Bibliographical search facilities.
It provides more than 30,000 text and reference books along with periodicals and National & International journals

Admission 
Admission on the institute is based on Pre-Polytechnic Test conducted by Vyavshaik Parikchmandal Bhopal (VYAPAM) is published by Directorate of Technical Education Madhya Pradesh, Bhopal in the month of May–June every Year.

Training and Placement 
Training and Placement Cell is the springboard for career development of students, their ultimate objective of pursuing technical education. The pre-placement training has become mandatory for students. The training part is taken care of by a dedicated wing of the Cell:

Continuing Education Cell which offers need-based training programmers and courses on modern technologies.

Hostel 

The College provides separate accommodation for girls & boys both for Dhar Polytechnic Mahavidhyalaya students.
There are 24 rooms and 3 floor search has 8 room 3 rooms are 2 seater and another 3 seater. one is for official. One Hall for Communication or meetings.

References

Universities and colleges in Madhya Pradesh
Dhar district
1946 establishments in India